Mark Mann (born 1970) is an American artist.

Biography 
Born in Oklahoma City, Oklahoma, Mann lives and works in Brooklyn, New York. His work has been purchased and collected by the Los Angeles County Museum of Art, Museum of Fine Arts, Houston, The Norton Museum of Art, Palm Beach, Florida, The George Eastman House, Rochester, New York, and the Progressive Corporate Collection.

References

External links
 Laurence Miller Gallery, New York City
 Markmannphotography.com (Mann’s site)
Mark Mann on Artnet

Living people
1970 births
Artists from Oklahoma City